F.Godmom is platform game released in 1991 for MS-DOS compatible operating systems and in 1996 for Microsoft Windows.

Gameplay
Players control a fairy godmother through levels of platforms and ladders to rescue her friends from evil crab-like monsters. Collecting all the tokens and finding the key reveals a level's exit. Players use a magic wand to transform the environment around her. The game uses a simple enemy behavior to keep them predictable.

The game includes a boss key. In order to return to the game, players must type in "FG" on the fake MS-DOS command prompt.

References

1991 video games
DOS games
Fantasy video games
North America-exclusive video games
Platform games
Video games developed in the United States
Video games featuring female protagonists
Windows games